Rocky Point Golf Course is a public 18-hole golf course in Tampa, Florida that is managed by the Tampa Sports Authority.

History
Rocky Point Golf Course was established in 1911 by the Tampa Automobile Club as the Tampa Automobile and Golf Club, and changed its name to the Rocky Point Golf Club in 1917. It was one of the first golf courses in the state of Florida. The course originally opened in 1912 with the first 9 holes, and construction was completed in 1913. The course was open for 31 years until the US entered World War II in 1942. During the war, the Federal Government closed the course for use as part of Drew Field and built barracks on the property to house prisoners of war. The course also served at this time as recreation for the servicemen stationed at Drew Field.

In 1953, the Federal Government turned the property over to the City of Tampa. The City then leased it to J.S. Curly Hurtman for 25 years, who reopened the course with his wife, Merle, in 1954. Merle took over operations when Curly passed in 1957.

In 1963, a third stretch of 9 holes was added. The land which originally housed the additional 9 holes is now home to ConnectWise and Labtech Software.

A community was developed south of the golf course in the late 1950s called Dana Shores. Later, in the 1970s, construction began on another development to the southeast of the course called Pelican Island. Today, both neighborhoods still exist and are thriving community partners for Rocky Point Golf Course.

Once the lease expired with the Hurtmans in 1978, the City turned over operations to the Tampa Sports Authority – a special district that was created in 1965 by Governor Hayden Burns for the purpose of planning, developing and maintaining a comprehensive complex of sports and recreational facilities for the Tampa Bay area. In December 1981, Mayor Bob Martinez leased 40+ acres of Rocky Point Golf Course to Critikon Corporation for 99 years in return for a 1.2 million dollar redesign. This included the return from 27 holes to 18 holes. The course reopened on March 5, 1983. The current clubhouse was built and opened in July, 1993.

Current
The Tampa Sports Authority still manages Rocky Point today along with Babe Zaharias Golf Course, Rogers Park Golf Course and Raymond James Stadium.

Today the 18-hole, par-71 Rocky Point Golf Course features four sets of tees playing from 4,900 to 6,300 yards, offering challenges for all skill levels.  $700,000 was put into the golf course in 2015 to update it to more modern standards and it reopened in December 2015. Golfers can experience a pleasurable but adventurous round of golf, with many areas reserved for wildlife habitat and bird sanctuaries. There is also a pro shop and full-service restaurant.

Local knowledge 

In the early part of the 1900s, the Tampa cigar industry was inundated by frequent strikes and brief walkouts by its workers. This trouble in the cigar industry affected the development at Rocky Point and temporarily delayed the construction of both the clubhouse and golf links.

References

Golf clubs and courses in Florida
Sports venues in Tampa, Florida
1911 establishments in Florida